Yağmur is a unisex Turkish given name and surname. In Turkish, "yağmur" means "rain." Notable people with the name include:

Given name
 Ece Yağmur Yavuz (born 2004), Turkish artistic gymnast
 Yağmur Arzu Elma (born 1996), Turkish water polo player
 Yağmur Koçyiğit (born 1988), Turkish female volleyball player
 Yağmur Sarıgül (born 1979), Turkish songwriter
Yağmur Şengül (born 1994), Turkish para-archer
 Yağmur Uraz (born 1990), Turkish female football player

Surname
 Eser Yağmur, Turkish football player
 Mehmet Yağmur, Turkish basketball player

Turkish-language surnames